Evelyn Fowler Grubb (August 9, 1931 – December 28, 2005) was the wife of an American Vietnam War Air Force pilot who became a prisoner of war, she was also a co-founder and then later served as the national coordinator of the National League of Families, a nonprofit organization that worked on behalf of Vietnam-era Missing in Action (MIA) and Prisoner of War (POW) Families. Grubb also oversaw the creation of the famous  "You Are Not Forgotten" POW/MIA flag that still flies in front of all U.S. Post Offices, many firehouses and police stations, all major U.S. Military installations as well as most veterans organization chapters in the United States.

During the Vietnam war Grubb served as the League's liaison to the White House, the United Nations and the Paris Peace Talks.

Grubb was also the co-author,  along with Carol Jose, of the book You Are Not Forgotten: A Family’s Quest for Truth and The Founding of the National League of Families about her personal struggle as the wife of a prisoner of war, and about her experiences helping to found the National League of Families.

Founding of the National League of Families

Evelyn Grubb was living in the Petersburg, Virginia area as an Air Force wife when her husband, Major Wilmer Newlin Grubb, was shot down over North Vietnam and became a prisoner of war (POW) in 1966, and after frustrations with the U.S. government withholding information on the status of her husband and other POW and MIA soldiers and pilots, as well as the Pentagon's practice of pressuring affected families not to speak publicly about the status of their captured or missing loved ones, Evelyn Grubb co-founded the National League of Families with Air Force POW wife Mary Crowe, also living in Hampton at the time, and with Sybil Stockdale,  a Navy pilot's wife living in Coronado, California, whose husband was also a POW.

Another major impetus for starting the organization was that Grubb's combat casualty benefits, as well as those of many other POW and MIA wives, were delayed due to a Pentagon policy of waiting to confirm that U.S. soldiers and pilots who had become POWs or MIAs were not deserters, which was causing POW and MIA families great financial hardship at the time. At the time that her benefits were being withheld, Grubb had four children, including a newborn child. Grubb was later instrumental in reversing this policy.

The Leagues purpose from the beginning was to bring pressure to bear on all governments involved in the conflict in order to improve treatment of POWs, and their families, and to bring resolution to the status of many missing in action (MIA) soldiers and pilots. The League continues to this day in this work.

After years of Evelyn Grubb's work on behalf of Vietnam POW and MIA families, the Government of North Vietnam announced that her husband had died years earlier in captivity, a fact that they had knowingly withheld for eight years. Evelyn Grubb died of breast cancer in 2005.

POW/MIA flag

Grubb oversaw the Leagues development of the "You Are Not Forgotten" POW/MIA flag in the early 1970s.[6][7] The original design for the flag was created by the artist Newt Heisley for Annin Flagmakers after Mary Hoff, wife of MIA Lt. Commander Michael Hoff U.S.N., recognized the need for a symbol for American POW/MIAs.[8] Evelyn Grubb was a driving force in gaining the flags adoption by the military, the U.S. Postal Service and other federal service agencies.[9] Eventually the flag became widely popular and adoption of its use began to spread on its own, as the flag became a national symbol of Vietnam war remembrance.[10] The flag, with the now widely recognized "You Are Not Forgotten, POW/MIA" logo is still flown in front of all U.S. post offices, all major U.S. military installations, and most fire stations, police stations, many state level agencies and also most veterans organizations chapters across the United States today, and is almost always present at most local and national veterans events in the United States.[11] The flag is consequently still visible to millions of Americans on a daily basis.[12]

Early life

Grubb was born in Pittsburgh and graduated from Pennsylvania State University.  She received a master's degree in education from Penn State in 1954.  Her husband was serving in Vietnam, and was then captured while she was living in Virginia.

Book

Writing

Grubb wrote the book, with co-author Carol Jose, entitled You Are Not Forgotten: A Family’s Quest for Truth and The Founding of the National League of Families.  A significant portion of the book was written by them during the three years up to Grubb's death from breast cancer in December 2005, but the book was still unfinished at the time, and Jose promised Grubb that it would be finished. The book was published by Vandemere Press in 2008.

Book Award

The book won the 2009 Indie Book Award, in the "History" category.

Foreword by Former US Secretary of State Henry Kissinger

Former US Secretary of State Henry Kissinger, who met with Grubb many times during her tenure as the Leagues National Coordinator, wrote the foreword to the book. In the foreword he emphasizes the importance of learning from some of the difficulties faced by Grubb and other POW and MIA wives of that era:

C-Span segment

In November 2008, the cable television channel C-SPAN did a special segment on Evelyn Grubb's life and the book, hosting a talk given by the book's co-author Carol Jose.

See also

Vietnam War POW/MIA issue
Vietnam war

References

External links
Video of C-SPAN special segment, Author Carol Jose speaks about the book "You Are Not Forgotten: A Family’s Quest for Truth and The Founding of the National League of Families" Includes history of how the POW/MIA flag was created.
National League of Families website Nonprofit organization co-founded by Evelyn Grubb
U.S. Army public affairs article about Evelyn Grubb and her experiences and work as a POW wife / League founder

American human rights activists
Women human rights activists
American women in the Vietnam War
American people of the Vietnam War
American veterans' rights activists
Military flags of the United States
National League of POW/MIA Families
Vietnam War POW/MIA activists
Vietnam War POW/MIA issues
Year of birth missing